The Walrus and the Carpenter is a restaurant and oyster bar in Seattle's Ballard neighborhood, in the U.S. state of Washington. In 2022, the restaurant received a James Beard Foundation Award nomination in the Outstanding Restaurant category, and was named one of the city's best seafood restaurants by Seattle Metropolitan.

See also 
 List of oyster bars
 List of restaurants in Seattle
 List of seafood restaurants

References

External links
 

Ballard, Seattle
Oyster bars in the United States
Seafood restaurants in Seattle